The European Communities (Amendment) Act 2002 (c. 3) is an Act of the Parliament of the United Kingdom which saw the fourth major amendment to the European Communities Act 1972 to include the provisions that were agreed upon in the Nice Treaty which was signed on 26 February 2001 to be incorporated into the domestic law of the United Kingdom. It was given Royal assent on 26 February 2002.

The Act was repealed by the European Union (Withdrawal) Act 2018 on 31 January 2020.

See also
 Acts of Parliament of the United Kingdom relating to the European Communities and the European Union
 European Union 

Acts of the Parliament of the United Kingdom relating to the European Union
United Kingdom Acts of Parliament 2002